Lovers and Luggers is a 1937 Australian film directed by Ken G. Hall. It is an adventure melodrama about a pianist (Lloyd Hughes) who goes to Thursday Island to retrieve a valuable pearl.

It was retitled Vengeance of the Deep in the US and United Kingdom.

Synopsis
In London, concert pianist Daubenny Carshott is feeling dissatisfied with his life and wanting a masculine adventure; he also desires the beautiful Stella Raff. Stella agrees to marry him if he brings back a large pearl with his own hands from Thursday Island. Daubenny notes a painting in Stella's apartment from "Craig Henderson" but when asked Stella is evasive about the artist.

Daubenny travels to Thursday Island where he buys a lugger and a house from the villainous Mendoza. He makes friends on the island, including another diver, Bill Craig, the drunken duo of McTavish and Dorner, and the boisterous Captain Quidley. He also meets Quidley's daughter, the beautiful Lorna, who likes to dress in men's clothing so she can walk around on her own at night. Lorna and Daubenny become friends and she secretly falls in love with him but Daubenny assumes she is in love with Craig.

Captain Quidley teaches Daubenny to dive. Quidley, Lorna, Daubenny and Mendoza all go out diving for pearls. Daubenny finds a pearl, to the fury of Mendoza, who believes since Daubenny used his lugger that Mendoza should have a share. Daubenny disagrees and the two men fight on board the lugger, causing the pearl to drop over the side.

Both men get in their diving suits and go down to retrieve the pearl. Mendoza dies and Daubenny is trapped. Bill Craig risks his life to rescue Daubenny.

Back on Thursday Island, Stella has arrived, accompanied by an aristocratic friend, Archie. Daubenny discovers that Bill Craig is Craig Henderson, and was also in love with Stella, and sent on a similar mission to find a pearl. Daubenny and Craig both reject Stella.

Daubenny decides to leave Thursday Island on his boat. Lorna reveals she is in love with him, not Craig, and the two kiss and decide to get married. They sail off into the sunset with Captain Quidley.

Cast

 Lloyd Hughes as Daubenny Carshott
 Shirley Ann Richards as Lorna Quidley
 Sidney Wheeler as Captain Quidley
 James Raglan as Bill Craig/Craig Henderson
Elaine Hamill as Stella Raff
 Frank Harvey as Carshott's manager
 Ronald Whelan as Mendoza
 Alec Kellaway as McTavish
Leslie Victor as Dormer
 Campbell Copelin as Archie
Charlie Chan as Kishimuni
Marcelle Marnay as Lotus
Horace Cleary as China Tom
Claude Turton as Charlie Quong
Bobbie Hunt as Lady Winter
Paul Furness as Professor of psychology
Charles Zoli as Carshott's valet
Bill Onus as an Aboriginal man

Original novel

The script was based on a 1928 novel by Gurney Slade, from whom Cinesound obtained the film rights in late 1936. In the novel, Daubenny travels to "Lorne" (Broome, thinly-disguised) rather than Thursday Island. Lorna is not related to Captain Quid, but actually is Stella's half-sister. There are two other British expatriates diving for pearls in addition to Craig, Chillon and Major Rawlings. Daubney does not romance Lorna and is reunited with a reformed Stella at the end. Lorna winds up with Craig.

Although the novel was set in Broome Ken G. Hall had Cinesound screenwriter Frank Harvey relocate the story to Thursday Island because it was easier to access.

Production

Casting
Hall gave the lead role to American actor Lloyd Hughes, who had been a star in the silent era and since then mostly worked on stage. Hall had met Hughes when the director visited Hollywood in 1935. The actor went on to make The Broken Melody for Hall.

This was the first of what would be several character roles Alec Kellaway played for Ken G. Hall. The cast included a Hong Kong actor called Charlie Chan.

Shooting
James Raglan was signed on a seven-week contract.

Hall was enthusiastic about the project because of his love for the tropics, although budget considerations meant most of the film had to be shot in the studio, with only the second unit going to Thursday Island under Frank Hurley. Hurley also shot some footage at Port Stephens and Broken Bay. Cinesound built one of its largest ever sets to recreate Thursday Island.

A tank was built to shoot the underwater scenes. However the water was not clear, so the scenes were shot at North Sydney Olympic Pool. Hall would direct scenes on boats by radio.

In June, Hall paid tribute to art director Eric Thompson saying, "we have had almost incessant rain since we began production some five weeks ago with the result that we have been compelled to keep on working 'exteriors,' and immediately we finish one set Eric's boys have to start demolishing and assembling a new set for the next take". Stuart F. Doyle resigned from Cinesound during production but was kept on to supervise the finishing of the movie.

Reports of the budget ranged from £18,000 to £24,000.

Reception
A charity ball was held to promote the release of the film.
The film was released in both the US and England.  It was the last Australian film sold to Britain as a British quota picture before the British quota laws were amended.

Critical
Reviews were positive, the critic from The Sydney Morning Herald calling it "Australia's finest picture to date." The Bulletin called it "a jolly good entertainer...a great advance even on   "Tall  
Timbers".   It hasn't spectacle as unique as the timber drive in that film, but it has an altogether better story, more interesting scenes, more action, more varied characters, and it deals with a   more colorful cross-section of life...It is almost incredibly better film than the narrative outline might seem to permit."

Box office
The movie was a slight disappointment at the box office, and Ken G. Hall thought this helped make Greater Union's then-managing director Norman Rydge disillusioned with feature production. Variety said it performed better in the "nabes and stix".

However Hall said in 1972 that "I think I like it best of all the pictures that I've made. Because of the backgrounds. I'd go tomorrow to make a film about the Tropics."

References

External links
Lovers and Luggers in the Internet Movie Database
Lovers and Luggers at Australian Screen Online
Lovers and Luggers at Oz Movies

1937 films
1930s adventure drama films
Melodrama films
Films directed by Ken G. Hall
Australian adventure drama films
Australian romantic drama films
1937 romantic drama films
1930s Australian films
1930s English-language films
Cinesound Productions films